Sweet Deceiver is the sixth studio album by Kevin Ayers and his last for Island Records. It is one of Ayers’ more rock-oriented productions, with the first side featuring the progressive material, while the second was more mainstream. Guitarist Ollie Halsall was now a key foil for Ayers and his playing on the opening track “Observations” is a clear demonstration of his dexterity. Elton John also joined the sessions, contributing some outstanding piano work to several tracks, including “Circular Letter” and “Toujours Le Voyage”.

Background
By 1975, Kevin Ayers had joined the roster of Elton John’s manager and partner John Reid, who put considerable energy into turning him into a mainstream artist, booking him appearances on early morning children's TV shows. Reid’s concept was to market Ayers as a pretty boy rock star and the cover painting he commissioned for Sweet Deceiver demonstrates this to shocking effect.

Ayers, however, was still a maverick musician and the packaging of the LP was alarmingly at odds with its contents which were some of his more poignant recordings. It was little wonder therefore, that critics like the NME’s Nick Kent (a long-time supporter), dismayed by Ayers’ new image, wrote virulent attacks on the LP. Ayers has subsequently stated in interviews that he was “deeply upset” by Kent's reaction to the album, although he failed to notice how delicately the scales of credibility were balanced within the 70s avant-garde music scene. Kent commented (NME, Dec 7, 1974) that when he first heard the song “Sweet Deceiver” at a Glasgow Apollo concert, “it rhymed ‘rain’ with ‘pain’ to questionable effect.”

However, it is Ayers himself who offers the most accurate critique of the situation in “Guru Banana” where he pointedly satirises his own pop promotion; "Who's the one with the grin on his face / Says he's gonna save the human race / He laughs a lot as he climbs to fame / Now what's his name? / Guru Banana! / That's me and I'll show you the light / I've got the answers and they're all right / 'cause I'm divine and you can be the same / Now what's my name? / Guru Banana!"

Track listing
All tracks written by Kevin Ayers.

Personnel

Musicians
 Kevin Ayers – vocals, fuzz bass, electric and acoustic 6 and 12 string guitars, mandolin
 Freddie Smith – drums
 Ollie Halsall – lead, acoustic and bass guitar, mandolin, honk piano, vibes, backing vocals (track 8)
Ollie Halsall is credited on the original album as Ollie Haircut.

Additional musicians
 Jacob Magnusson – organ, accordion, piano, clavinet, (tracks 1, 3-4, 6, 8), vocals (track 1)
 John Altman – clarinet (track 2)
 Fuzzy Samuels – bass guitar (track 8)
 Elton John – piano (tracks 2, 4, 7)
 Bias Boshell – piano (track 5)
 Chili Charles – drums (track 8)
 Muscle Shoals Horns – brass (track 8)
 The Manor choir – backing vocals (tracks 3, 8)

Technical
 Kevin Ayers, Ollie Halsall – producers
 Steve Cox – engineer
 Vic Gamm – engineer
 Joe Gaffney – photography
 Tony Wright – cover art

References & Sources

Ayers and Graces by Nick Kent (NME Dec 7, 1974)
Despair and Temperence in Maida Vale by Mike Flood Page (Sounds Jan 25, 1975)
Cousin Kevin by Hervé Picart (Extra [FR] Apr, 1975)
Album Review by Paul Alessandrini (Rock & Folk [FR] Apr, 1975)
Soft Centered by Pierre Perrone (The Independent Sep 10, 2007)
Original LP sleevenotes

1975 albums
Kevin Ayers albums
Island Records albums
Albums produced by Kevin Ayers